Alex Paul Barris,  (September 16, 1922 – January 15, 2004) was an American-born Canadian television actor and writer. Member of ACTRA, he was a writer and panelist for the game show Front Page Challenge.

Barris was born in New York City, and moved to Canada, residing in Scarborough, Ontario. Barris was 81 when he died due to complications from a stroke he suffered a year earlier in Toronto, Ontario. 

His son, Ted, is a retired journalism professor and author of several books. In 1998, Alex Barris was made a Member of the Order of Canada.

References

External links

1922 births
2004 deaths
American emigrants to Canada
Canadian television personalities
Members of the Order of Canada
Male actors from New York City
Writers from New York City
Male actors from Toronto
Writers from Scarborough, Toronto